The Bagatelles, Op. 33, for solo piano were composed by Ludwig van Beethoven (1770–1827) in 1801–02 and published in 1803 through the Viennese publisher . The seven bagatelles are quite typical of Beethoven's early style, retaining many compositional features of the early Classical period.

The first bagatelle, which is in the key of E-flat major, is perhaps the most well-known of the set. It is in the form A–B–A. The A section starts with the right hand playing a soothing melody, and the left hand accompanying it with broken chords. The B section, which starts with the key of E-flat minor, plays a simple melody, then modulates to the original key with the B-flat major scale and then the E-flat major scale, then back to the A section.
The second bagatelle, in C major, is the perhaps the second hardest of the set. It contains third scales, arpeggios, and a continuous left hand scale.
The third bagatelle, in F major, starts off with the right hand playing the introduction and the left hand playing arpeggios.
The fourth bagatelle, in A major, the middle section is in the key of A minor.
The fifth bagatelle, which perhaps is the hardest of the set, is in the key of C major. It starts off with arpeggios, a little similar to Chopin's Étude Op. 10, No. 1. After the introduction, the right hand and the left hand play the melody with their 4th and 5th fingers. After the C minor section it goes back to the main theme.
The sixth bagatelle, is in the key of D major.
The seventh and final bagatelle, is in the key of A-flat major. It starts off with the left hand playing staccatos, and the right hand playing the melody.

See also
Bagatelles, Op. 119
Bagatelles, Op. 126

External links 
 
 

Piano solos by Ludwig van Beethoven
1803 compositions